Google Me is a 2007 American documentary film about the act of finding oneself on the search engine, Google, and the implications directed and produced by Jim Killeen. The film's music was composed by Geoff Levin.

Synopsis 
This documentary is about a man, Jim Killeen, who decided to go beyond a Google search of himself and record the exploration and interactions with the men who share his name. Killeen made the decision to be thorough in his endeavors and took the extra step to travel to the location of these men to get the full scoop on the stories of their lives. He faced more rejection than expected initially when extending the offer to travel to the location of his fellow Killeen's, even gambling in a poker tournament to raise funds for the film production. Killeen meets several other Jim Killeen's all ranging from a priest in Ireland to a swinger in Colorado. They all have exceptionally different backgrounds and shockingly a couple of them actually favor each other in looks. Killeen focuses on the similarities of their lifestyles, in spite of their implied social contradictions. At the end of the film Killeen asks all of them questions such as "What is the purpose of life?" to things they do and do not believe in. At the end of the movie all of the Jim Killeen's meet in Killeen, TX for the 125th year celebration. They all join in on the town's celebration and share their life stories with each other. This movie exposes the common denominator of different people with different lives and shows the audience how the internet can shape our own identity. These two components provide stories and insight on the power of technology in the digital age.

Cast

Jim Killeen as himself, filmmaker
Jeannie Roshar as herself
Father Jim Killeen as himself, priest in Ireland 
Jim Killeen as himself, Scotland, United Kingdom
Jim Killeen as himself, Colorado, USA 
Jim Killeen as himself, Australia
Jim Killeen as himself, New York, USA 
Jim Killeen as himself, St. Louis, MO
There are a total of six different men with the name "Jim Killeen" throughout the film.

Themes
Through the use of Google, one man was able to link humanity and life through something as similar as a name. The director, Jim Killeen, conveys that life is much more than names and words, every person has a story to tell.

Production
The documentary Google Me began production in 2007 and was inspired by the star of the project, Jim Killeen. Because of his interest in the project, Jim produced the movie using his own funding, money won from a poker tournament, which is not a generally used strategy in creating a film. The film was produced in multiple cities including New York, Australia, Ireland, Killeen, TX and Denver. The company Google did know about the production of this film and did give Jim Killeen permission to use the companies name.

Release
On November 25, 2007, the film was first released on DVD in the United States.

Critical response

Critical Response: The movie Google Me was released in 2007 and directed by Jim Killeen. Los Angeles called described the movie as "Entertaining." Efilmcritic gave the movie "★★★★." BoxOffice.com said, "New and Interesting." Markee said, "Great Fun." My West Texas described the movie as "Special." Cnet's News.com said the movie had "Valuable Insights." Burke Leader lead said the movie had a "Potent Theme." The Washington Post described the movie as "An inspiring truth about being human."

Box office 
Google Me was widely released in theaters on November 25, 2007.

Accolades
The film was screened in 2007 at the Newport Beach Film Festival in 2007. Google Me did not win any awards at the festival.

References

External links
 
 
 https://www.washingtonpost.com/wp-dyn/content/article/2007/08/12/AR2007081201315.html
 http://gawker.com/384475/google-me-documentary-an-irony-free-feel-good-flick-with-literal-cult-appeal

2007 films
2007 documentary films
American documentary films
Documentary films about the Internet
2000s English-language films
2000s American films
English-language documentary films